This is a list of opinion polls taken on the presidency of Joe Biden in 2022. To navigate between years, see opinion polling on the Joe Biden administration.

The Gallup poll has shown a general decline in Biden's job approval since his inauguration. He began his presidency with a 57% approval rating in January, 2021. During his seventh quarter in office (Jul 20-Oct 19, 2022) he had a 42% approval rating, comparable to other presidents since Jimmy Carter, with the exception of George H. W. Bush and George W. Bush, who enjoyed higher ratings at that stage of their presidencies due to military actions.

Throughout 2022, Biden continued having a higher disapproval than approval rating, which had begun in August 2021. Most Republicans continued to disapprove of his presidency and some Democrats believed Biden's policies had made no difference to help people. At certain points, two-thirds of Americans disapproved of Biden's handling of the economy.

The Biden administration saw its polling flip after the withdrawal of United States troops from Afghanistan. Over the following months, approval ratings continued to fall as inflation and gas prices increased.

A Washington Post-ABC News poll conducted January 27-February 1, 2023, found that 62 percent of Americans think Biden has accomplished "not very much" or "little or nothing" during his presidency, while 36 percent say he has accomplished "a great deal" or "a good amount."

Job approval ratings 

The graph below shows the average of the aggregate polls listed below.

Aggregate polls 
Poll numbers verified .

January

February

March

April

May

June

July

August

September

October

November

December

By race 
In December 2021 a PBS/Marist poll, found that just 33% of Hispanics approve of Biden, while 65% disapprove. In contrast, 40% of whites approve, while 56% disapprove.

In May 2022, a Quinnipiac poll found that Biden had an approval rating from Hispanics at 26%, White voters at 29%, and 63% from Black voters. In June 3–6, 2022, a Quinnipiac poll found that Biden had his then lowest approval rating from Hispanics at 24%, and 49% of Blacks.

On July 19, 2022, a Quinnipiac poll found that Biden had his lowest approval rating from Hispanics at 19%, while 70% disapprove.

References 

2022 in American politics
Presidency of Joe Biden
Opinion polling in the United States